The 1972 Chicago Bears season was their 53rd regular season completed in the National Football League. The team finished with a 4–9–1 record, another below .500 showing, in head coach Abe Gibron's first season. But they had good success on the QB Rushing. QB Bobby Douglass ran on 143 carries for 968 yards and 8 Touchdowns. This would be later broken by Atlanta Falcons QB Michael Vick who became the first and only Quarterback to run over 1,000 yards in the NFL. But it would be held as a franchise record until Justin Fields broke that in the 2022 season. Only three other QBs ran for over 1,000 yards in one season, but they were all in the CFL.

NFL Draft

Roster

Schedule

Standings

References 

Chicago Bears
Chicago Bears seasons
Chicago Bears